Ossi Karttunen (born 17 March 1948) is a Finnish sprinter. He competed in the men's 400 metres at the 1976 Summer Olympics.

References

1948 births
Living people
Athletes (track and field) at the 1972 Summer Olympics
Athletes (track and field) at the 1976 Summer Olympics
Finnish male sprinters
Olympic athletes of Finland
Place of birth missing (living people)